Lucy Coleman (born 29 March 1998) is an Australian representative lightweight rower. She has represented at senior World Championships.

Club and state rowing
Coleman was raised in far western NSW and boarded at St Hilda's School in Southport where she took up rowing. She first made state selection for Queensland in the 2017 women's youth eight which contested the Bicentennial Cup at the Interstate Regatta within the Australian Rowing Championships. 

Coleman then studied at the University of Tulsa in Oklahoma and rowed at varsity level. She won a silver medal in a lightweight women's double scull at the US IRA Championships in 2018. Following her return from the USA she rowed from the Sydney University Boat Club. 

In 2021 in SUBC colours she won the open lightweight women's quad scull title at the Australian Rowing Championships and placed second in the open lightweight double scull.

International representative rowing
In March 2022 Coleman was selected in the Australian senior training team to prepare for the 2022 international season and the 2022 World Rowing Championships.  She rowed Australia's lightweight double scull with Anneka Reardon at the World Rowing Cup II in June 2022 to a silver medal.  At the 2022 World Rowing Championships at Racize, she again raced the lightweight double with Reardon. They finished fourth in the B final for an overall tenth place finish at the regatta.

References

External links
Coleman at World Rowing

1999 births
Living people
Australian female rowers